Pedro Afonso is a municipality in the state of Tocantins in the Northern region of Brazil.

Xaraó, an extinct Jê language, was once spoken in the municipality.

See also
List of municipalities in Tocantins

References

Municipalities in Tocantins